Nina Potočnik (born 12 January 1997) is a Slovenian tennis player.

She has a career-high singles ranking of world No. 310, achieved on 22 August 2022. On 8 August 2022, she peaked at No. 398 in the WTA doubles rankings. Potočnik has won four singles titles and six doubles titles on the ITF Circuit.

She made her Fed Cup debut in 2018.

ITF Circuit finals

Singles: 6 (5 titles, 1 runner-up)

Doubles: 8 (6 titles, 2 runner-ups)

References

External links
 
 
 

1997 births
Living people
Slovenian female tennis players
People from Ptuj
21st-century Slovenian women